A list of members of the National Assembly of Cambodia include:

First National Assembly, 1993–98
Second National Assembly, 1998–2003
Third National Assembly, 2003–08
Fourth National Assembly, 2008–2013
Fifth National Assembly, 2013–18
Sixth National Assembly, 2018–2023